James R. Bettman is an American academic who is the Burlington Industries Professor of Business Administration at Fuqua School of Business, Duke University. He is known for his work on consumer behavior and decision making. He is a Fellow of the American Marketing Association, American Psychological Association, the American Psychological Society, and the Association for Consumer Research.

Books

Selected research publications
Bettman, James R., Mary Frances Luce, and John W. Payne. "Constructive consumer choice processes." Journal of Consumer Research 25, no. 3 (1998): 187-217.
Bettman, James R., and C. Whan Park. "Effects of prior knowledge and experience and phase of the choice process on consumer decision processes: A protocol analysis." Journal of Consumer Research 7, no. 3 (1980): 234-248.
Bettman, James R., and Pradeep Kakkar. "Effects of information presentation format on consumer information acquisition strategies." Journal of Consumer Research 3, no. 4 (1977): 233-240.
Bettman, James R., Noel Capon, and Richard J. Lutz. "Cognitive algebra in multi-attribute attitude models." Journal of Marketing Research (1975): 151-164.
Bettman, James R. "Information processing models of consumer behavior." Journal of Marketing Research (1970): 370-376.

References

External links
 

Living people
Duke University faculty
Marketing people
Fellows of the American Marketing Association
1943 births